During the 2013–14 FC Utrecht season, the club participated in the Eredivisie, KNVB Cup and UEFA Europa League.

Competitions

Eredivsie

League table

Results

Europa League Qualification

Differdange 03 won 5–4 on aggregate.

KNVB Cup

References

Utrecht
FC Utrecht seasons